Mahmud Us Samad Chowdhury (3 January 1955 – 11 March 2021) was a Bangladesh Awami League politician and a Jatiya Sangsad member representing the Sylhet-3 constituency for three terms.

Early life
Chowdhury was born on 3 January 1955 in Nurpur, Fenchuganj to Delwar Hossain Chowdhury and Asiya Khanom Chowdhury. He was the sixth of seven brothers and had four elder sisters.The wider family mostly reside in UK and US. He had an MBA degree, which he obtained from a university in the UK.

Career

Chowdhury was elected to Parliament from Sylhet-3 on 5 January 2014 as an Awami League candidate. He was a member of Bangladesh Garment Manufacturers and Exporters Association. Chowdhury also served as the Vice-President of the Awami League's Sylhet District Unit.

Death
After contracting COVID-19, during the COVID-19 pandemic in Bangladesh, Chowdhury was taken to United Hospital, Dhaka where he died on 11 March 2021. A Bangladesh Air Force helicopter later took his body to his home upazila of Fenchuganj, landing at the Natural Gas Fertiliser Factory playground. Thereafter, an ambulance transported him to his residence, the Nurpur Borobari, and his janaza was conducted at Kasim Ali Model High School. He was then buried in his family graveyard in Nurpur.

References

1955 births
2021 deaths
People from Fenchuganj Upazila
Awami League politicians
9th Jatiya Sangsad members
10th Jatiya Sangsad members
11th Jatiya Sangsad members
Deaths from the COVID-19 pandemic in Bangladesh